Trestonia confusa is a species of beetle in the family Cerambycidae. It was described by Dillon and Dillon in 1946. It is known from Colombia, Costa Rica and Panama.

References

confusa
Beetles described in 1946